Poronin railway station is a railway station in Poronin (Lesser Poland), Poland. As of 2022, it is served by Koleje Śląskie (Silesian Voivodeship Railways), Polregio, and PKP Intercity (EIP, InterCity, and TLK services).

Train services

The station is served by the following services:

Intercity services (IC) Warsaw - Kraków - Zakopane 
Intercity services (IC) Gdynia - Gdańsk - Bydgoszcz - Łódź - Czestochowa — Krakow — Zakopane
Intercity services (IC) Bydgoszcz - Poznań - Leszno - Wrocław - Opole - Rybnik - Bielsko-Biała - Zakopane
Intercity services (IC) Szczecin - Białogard - Szczecinek - Piła - Poznań - Ostrów Wielkopolski - Katowice - Zakopane
Intercity services (TLK) Gdynia Główna — Zakopane 
Regional Train of Podhale Region (Podhalańska Kolej Regionalna) (PKR) Zakopane - Nowy Targ 
Regional services (PR) Zakopane - Nowy Targ - Rabka-Zdrój 
Regional services (PR) Zakopane - Nowy Targ - Chabówka - Skawina - Kraków Płaszów 
Regional services (PR) Zakopane - Nowy Targ - Chabówka - Skawina - Kraków Główny 
Regional services (KŚ)  Katowice - Pszczyna - Bielsko-Biała Gł - Żywiec - Nowy Targ - Zakopane

References 

Station article at  koleo.pl

Railway stations in Lesser Poland Voivodeship
Railway stations served by Przewozy Regionalne InterRegio
Railway stations in Poland opened in 1899